is a single by the Jpop vocalist Yuki Matsuoka and was used as the third closing theme for the Japanese dub of the 1987 Ninja Turtles series. It was written by Mitsuko Shiramine and composed by Hideaki Fukutomi. It was released by Sony Records on June 21, 1995, in Japan only and is coupled with the song "Ano Toki mo Ano Toki mo".

Track list
青い空の写真を見た。Aoi Sorano Syasinwo Mita/I Watched a Blue Empty Photograph
あの時もあの時もAno Toki mo Ano Toki mo/As for That Time, as for That Time
青い空の写真を見た。(オリジナル・カラオケ)Aoi Sorano Syasinwo Mita (Orijinaru Karaoke)/I Watched a Blue Empty Photograph (Original Karaoke)

External links
Yahoo Music page

1995 singles
Teenage Mutant Ninja Turtles music